Our Lady of the Nile is a 2019 film directed by Atiq Rahimi. An adaptation of the novel Our Lady of the Nile by Rwandan writer Scholastique Mukasonga, the film is set in Rwanda in 1973, amid the beginning of the tensions between the Hutu and Tutsi peoples that would eventually culminate in the Rwandan genocide.

Plot 
Set in pre-genocide Rwanda, the film tells how the genocide is experienced from the perspective of Hutu and Tutsi teenage girls from Our Lady of the Nile, an elite Catholic boarding school.

Cast 

 Veronica (Clariella Bizimana)
 Virginia (Amanda Santa Mugabekazi)
 Monsieur Fontenaille (Pascal Greggory)
 Gloriosa (Albina Kirenga)
 Modesta (Belinda Rubango)

Awards 
2020 Berlin International Film Festival, Winner: Crystal Bear (Generation 14plus) Best Film

Festivals 

 2019 Toronto Film Festival (where it premiered)
 2019. Antalya Golden Orange Film Festival
 2020, Giffoni Film Festival
 2020, Cinemania
 2020 Africa in Motion
 2020, São Paulo International Film Festival
 2020, Fribourg International Film Festival
 2020, Seville European Film Festival
 2020, Palm Springs International Film Festival
 2020, Haifa International Film Festival
 2020, Luxor African Film Festival
 2021, Adelaide Film Festival
 2021, New York African Film Festival
 Darwin Film Festival
 Marrakech International Film Festival

References

External links 
 
 Our Lady of the Nile at Rotten Tomatoes
 Our Lady of the Nile at Metacritic

2019 films
2019 drama films
French drama films
Belgian drama films
Rwandan drama films
2010s French films
Films based on novels